Heidi Franz (born January 14, 1995) is an American professional racing cyclist, who currently rides for UCI Women's Continental Team .

Major results
2019
 1st Stage 2 Tour of the Gila
2021
 1st  Sprints classification Setmana Ciclista Valenciana

References

External links
 

1995 births
Living people
American female cyclists
21st-century American women
Cyclists from Washington (state)